I due carabinieri (The Two Carabinieri) is a 1984 Italian crime comedy film directed by Carlo Verdone.

Plot 
Marino (Carlo Verdone) and Glauco (Enrico Montesano) enlist with the Carabinieri in order to change their lives and find stability and maturity within the military discipline of the armed force. During training, they also find a third partner in Adalberto (Massimo Boldi), sickly heir to an affluent family, also pursuing a law enforcement career in an effort to grow more independent from his over-protecting parents. The trio share various adventures until graduation, and then begin to take part in real missions, with happy-go-lucky and carefree attitude, to the point of simulating a fake police raid to a clandestine brothel in hope to get free service, partaking to confiscated cocaine, flirting with some women that are victims of phone molestations.
Eventually Adalberto gets killed in action, while the friendship between Marino and Glauco seems to break down as they both love Marino's cousin, Rita. She reciprocates Glauco's love but only has brotherly affection for Marino, who feels therefore betrayed in his imaginary relationship with the woman, and attacks violently the colleague.
In the end however harmony is recovered, when Glauco risks his life to save the old friend and a group of boy scouts which had been taken hostage by a madman on the same train.

Cast 
 Carlo Verdone: Marino Spada
 Enrico Montesano: Glauco Sperandio
 Paola Onofri: Rita
 Massimo Boldi: Adalberto Occhipinti
 Marisa Solinas: the friend of Turin 
 Guido Celano: Uncle Renato 
 Andrea Aureli: Commander
 John Steiner: Criminal on train
 Anna Maria Torniai: Aunt Ernestina

Reception
The film was the fourth highest-grossing film in Italy for the year with a gross of $2.1 million (4.2 billion lire) from 12 key cities and the second highest-grossing local film, behind Nothing Left to Do But Cry.

See also    
 List of Italian films of 1984

References

External links

1984 films
Films directed by Carlo Verdone
1980s buddy cop films
1980s buddy comedy films
Italian buddy comedy films
1980s police comedy films
1984 comedy films
1980s Italian-language films
1980s Italian films